Salim Chishti (1478–1572) was a Sufi saint of the Chishti Order during the Mughal Empire in India.

Biography

Sheikh Salim Chishti was a descendant of Sheikh Farid, a Punjabi Sunni Muslim preacher and mystic.

The Mughal Emperor Akbar came to Chishti's home in Sikri to ask him to pray for a male heir to the throne. Chishti blessed Akbar, and soon the first of three sons was born to him. He named his first son 'Salim' (later emperor Jahangir) in honor of Chishti. A daughter of Sheikh Salim Chishti was the foster mother of Emperor Jahangir. The emperor was deeply attached to his foster mother, as reflected in the Jahangirnama and he was extremely close to her son Qutb-ud-din Khan Koka who was made the governor of Bengal and Orissa.

His eldest son, Saaduddin Khan, was ennobled Saaduddin Siddiky and was granted three jagirs in the Gazipur District of Amenabad, Talebabad and Chandrapratap. Currently, his great grandson Kursheed Aleem Chishti lives there and is the 16th generation of Salim Chishti. These descendants in Bangladesh include Chowdhury Kazemuddin Ahmed Siddiky, the co-founder of the Assam Bengal Muslim League and the University of Dhaka; Justice Badruddin Ahmed Siddiky; Chowdhury Tanbir Ahmed Siddiky, the Commerce Minister of Bangladesh;and Chowdhury Irad Ahmed Siddiky, an anti-corruption activist and candidate for the Mayor of Dhaka in 2015. The descendant of his second-eldest son, Shaikh Ibrahim, was granted the title Kishwar Khan and now reside in Sheikhupur, Badaun in India.

Salim Chishti tomb

See also
 Islam Khan I (grandson)
 Islam Khan V
 Mukarram Khan, great-grandson
 Sheikhupur, Badaun
 Qutubuddin Koka

References

External links
 

Indian Sufi saints
Chishti Order
People from Agra
Fatehpur Sikri
1478 births
1572 deaths
Akbar
Chishtis